Alfred Okou (born 3 September 1963) is a former Ivorian rugby union player. He played as a flanker.

He played for Stade Poitevin Rugby in France.

Okou had 7 caps for Ivory Coast, from 1993 to 1995, scoring 1 try, 5 points in aggregate- He was called for the 1995 Rugby World Cup, playing in all the three games and scoring the single try of his career.

External links
Alfred Okou International Statistics

1963 births
Living people
Sportspeople from Abidjan
Ivorian rugby union players
Rugby union flankers